Alfred Staines (22 May 1838 – 13 June 1910) was an English professional cricketer. Staines was a wicket-keeper who played in five first-class cricket matches for Kent County Cricket Club in 1863 and 1864.

Staines was born at Charlton in Kent in 1838. He made his first-class debut for the county against Surrey in 1863. He died at Sydenham in London in June 1910 aged 72.

References

External links

1838 births
1910 deaths
People from Charlton, London
English cricketers
Kent cricketers
Wicket-keepers